David G. Marwell (born 1951) is an American historian and the former director of the Museum of Jewish Heritage in New York City. Marwell received a BA from Brandeis University and a Ph.D. in modern European history from  Binghamton University.

Career
Prior to his work at the U.S. Holocaust Memorial Museum in Washington, D.C. from 1997 to 2000, Marwell was director of the Berlin Document Center from 1988 to 1994 and then executive director of the Assassination Records Review Board.

He also served as Chief of Investigative Research for the U.S. Department of Justice Office of Special Investigations. In that capacity, Marwell was responsible for conducting historical and forensic research in support of Justice Department prosecution of Nazi war criminals, including Klaus Barbie and Josef Mengele. He has also served as an expert witness and consultant to the governments of Canada and Australia on several war crime prosecutions, and was a member of the Interagency Working Group for Nazi War Criminal Documents. Marwell also serves as President of the Leo Baeck Institute New York|Berlin and on the board of FASPE (Fellowships at Auschwitz for the Study of Professional Ethics), the Auschwitz Jewish Center, The Defiant Requiem Foundation, and the Center for Jewish History .

Marwell's book, MENGELE: Unmasking the "Angel of Death" about Josef Mengele was published in January 2020.

Works
 Mengele: Unmasking the "Angel of Death". Norton & Company, Incorporated, W.W., 2020.

References

Living people
21st-century American historians
21st-century American male writers
Binghamton University alumni
1951 births
American male non-fiction writers